Walter Richmond Heap Jr. (September 18, 1921 – May 20, 1989) was an American football player who played at the quarterback position on both offense and defensive. He played college football for Texas and professional football for the Los Angeles Dons.

Early years
Heap was born in 1921 in Taylor, Texas. He attended and played football at Taylor High School.

Military and college football
He played college football for the University of Texas Longhorns in 1940, 1941, and 1946. 

His career was interrupted by service in the amphibious force of the United States Coast Guard during World War II. He served on LSTs in eight amphibious invasions in the Pacific theater of operations. Based on his outstanding battle record, he was chosen as a special honor guard for President Harry S. Truman at his June 1945 speech before the United Nations in San Francisco.

Professional football
Heap was selected by the Boston Yanks in the second round (13th overall pick) of the 1947 NFL Draft and by the Los Angeles Dons in the 10th round (77th overall pick) of the 1947 AAFC Draft. He played with the Dons during their 1947 and 1948 seasons.

Family and later years
He died in 1989 at age 67 in Dallas.

References

1921 births
1989 deaths
Los Angeles Dons players
Texas Longhorns football players
Players of American football from Texas
People from Taylor, Texas
American football quarterbacks
United States Coast Guard personnel of World War II